Gakgatla is a village in Kweneng District of Botswana. The village is located around 40 km north-west of the capital of Botswana, Gaborone. The population of Gakgatla was 211 in 2001 census.

The headman of Arbitration is Lenyetse Moshapa.

References

Kweneng District
Villages in Botswana